The 1995 Danamon Indonesia Open was a women's tennis tournament played on outdoor hard courts at the Gelora Senayan Stadium in Jakarta, Indonesia and was part of Tier III of the 1995 WTA Tour. It was the third edition of the tournament and was held from 2 January through 8 January 1995. First-seeded Sabine Hack won the singles title and earned $26,500 first-prize money.

Finals

Singles
 Sabine Hack defeated  Irina Spîrlea 2–6, 7–6(8–6), 6–4
 It was Hack's only singles title of the year and the 4th and last of her career.

Doubles
 Claudia Porwik /  Irina Spîrlea defeated  Laurence Courtois /  Nancy Feber 6–2, 6–3
 It was Porwik's 1st title of the year and the 5th of her career. It was Spîrlea's 1st title of the year and the 3rd of her career.

References

External links
 ITF tournament edition details
 Tournament draws

Danamon Indonesia Open
Danamon Open
Danamon Indonesia Open
Danamon Indonesia Open